SimSafari is a construction and management simulation game released by Maxis on March 19, 1998. It is similar to SimPark, except that the park is set in Africa rather than in North America, and therefore has African animals and plants.

Gameplay
The game is divided into three different zones, the nature park, the tourist grounds, and the African village. The ultimate aim is for the players' park to reach five stars, although like most Sims games the player can continue playing indefinitely. To gain five stars, the player needs to make sure each zone is being run properly. The player can control tourism and staff.

 The park is where the player can buy animals and made sure they were not being over-eaten or underfed. The player can control the species of animals, grasses, shrubs, and trees that were built here. The game has information on every species in it, with short animations for the animals. Natural disasters can occur, like fires, droughts, locusts, and twisters.
 The Camp, also known as the Tourist Ground, is where tourists stay. The player can build restaurants, hotels, swimming pools, cottages, tents, etc. for guests. The buildings are staffed by workers hired from the village.
 In the village the player can hire drivers, naturalists, guides, cooks, and attendants to staff your tourist grounds. The more staff are hired, the better the village does. The village poaches your park's animals if the player does not hire enough staff. If things go very badly, the village might even stop working for you altogether. The player has the least control over the village because it is up to the AI to decide what to build.

There are several scenarios, including one where the park is overrun by rabbits and another where the camp is burned down.

References

External links
 

1998 video games
Classic Mac OS games
Maxis Sim games
Video games developed in the United States
Video games scored by Jerry Martin
Video games set in Africa
Video games with isometric graphics
Windows games